Veera: An Arrow Head of Action is a 2011 Telugu-language action comedy film, produced by Ganesh Indukuri under Sanvi Productions banner and directed by Ramesh Varma. It stars Ravi Teja, Kajal Aggarwal, and Taapsee Pannu, with music composed by S. Thaman. The cinematography was performed by Chota K. Naidu and the film was released on 20 May 2011. The film had completed 50 days in 60 centres and a 100-day run at the box office according to Zee 24 Gantalu. The film was released in Tamil as Veeraiyaah, in Hindi as The Great Veera in 2012 and also in Malayalam as Veera in 2017 it was also in Bhojpuri as Veera. In 2021, Manish Shah from Goldmines Telefilms redubbed the movie in Hindi under the same name.

Plot
Shyamsunder is an honest ACP who comes into conflict with the local don, Dhanraj. The goons kill Shyam's son, Moksha, and Shyam does not reveal this to his family but fears the villains may kill his daughter also. Dhanraj threatens Shyam's family so the police department arranges for an officer to provide security for them. Deva arrives and saves Shyam from Dhanraj's men and introduces himself as the security officer. Shyam's family still believes that their son is in the boarding school and waits for his call on a Sunday, but instead, they are told their son went on an excursion. Shyam gets tensed and reveals everything to Deva. When he goes to drop Anjali (ACP's daughter) at school with Tiger, with whom he shares his room, he meets Aiki, who later falls for him.

Shyaam's wife Sathya dislikes Deva and doesn't want him involved with her family while Aiki falls in love with him. Shyaam learns that Deva is not the security officer appointed by the police department. It is revealed that Deva is Veera, a person who is like god to the whole village. He actually kills the security officer Deva (who works for Dhanraj) and replaces him. Sathya is his step-sister. In the pre-interval scene, Dhanraj comes to kill Shyam and his family, and Veera bashes them badly and protects his sister's family. But when Dhanraj tries to kill them, he gets killed by Pedda Rayudu who suddenly arrives and introduces himself as the nemesis of Veera and shoots him. Veera loses consciousness.

A police officer sends Veera to Shyam's family. After the interval, the flashback begins. Veera was a powerful and kind-hearted landlord of a village. Every villager loved him very much. He lived with his younger brother, friends, and his beautiful wife Chitra. But there was another landlord who was Pedda Rayudu who wants to vacate the whole village to build a factory. But Veera opposes him. Pedda tries to torture the villagers and Veera beats him badly. Veera's younger brother marries the daughter of the officer, who later sends Veera to Shyam's family. Embarrassed, the wife of Pedda kills herself. Pedda became angry and killed Veera's entire family, including Chitti who was pregnant, when Veera was not present. When Veera finds out, he killed all of Pedda's henchmen. Pedda was supposed to die in an explosion, but he survives. Veera doesn't know that Pedda had survived. Sathya blames Veera for the death of their family. That's why Sathya disliked Veera. Later, Veera comes to the city to save his step-sister's family. The flashback episode ends.

Pedda challenges Veera and after a long fight between the two, Veera kills Pedda and takes his revenge. Then Aiki proposes to Veera and he agrees. And he reunites with his sister happily.

Cast

Production
In January 2010, the first look of Veera was released by Sanvi Productions, the producers of the film, with Ravi Teja in the lead role and Ramesh Varma as the director. Furthermore, a leading technical crew was announced with Devi Sri Prasad as music composer, Chota K. Naidu as cinematographer, Marthand K. Venkatesh as editor and the Parachuri brothers as writers. The casting process began in June 2010 with Anushka Shetty was signed on to play the lead female role with Taapsee Pannu selected to play a supporting role in the film. Anushka walked out of the project before filming began and was subsequently replaced by Kajal Aggarwal, whilst Devi Sri Prasad was also replaced by Thaman. Shaam and Sridevi Vijayakumar were also signed on to play a supporting roles in the film.

After further delays, the film began its first schedule in November 2010 at Madhapur Art Gallery in Hyderabad. The filming was wrapped in May 2011 at Switzerland after shooting couple of romantic songs.

Soundtrack

The audio release of the film was done in a very simple manner. Music director S. Thaman, director Gopichand Malineni, Aditya Music CEO Dayanand,B.A. Raju were present at the function. S. Thaman released the CD and handed it over to Gopichand Malineni.

S. Thaman said that since the entire unit is present at Switzerland as of now busy with the shooting he was organising this audio release and songs in the movie are according to the body language of Ravi Teja and also informed that NTR old classic Mavilla thota kada was remixed in the movie according to the requirement.

The movie has celebrated its triple platinum disc function in Taj Deccan. Ravi Teja, Brahmanandam, Sridevi Vijaykumar, Ali, Chota K Naidu, Ram-Lakshman, Dayanand, S. Thaman and others were present at the function.

Reception
A critic from The Times of India gave the film a rating of 2/5 and wrote that "After testing new waters previously, in “Veera” we see actor Ravi Teja treading the tried-and-tested formula film path yet again. “Veera” will only appeal to the front-bench fans of Ravi Teja". A critic from Rediff wrote: "tedious watch". A critic from Sify wrote: "Veera is only fine in parts wherever Ravi Teja is shown in a mass dimension. There is unnecessary violence and the screenplay is hackneyed. Director Ramesh Varma was purely focusing to showcase Ravi Teja on the lines of a superhero but he failed miserably".

References

External links

2010s Telugu-language films
2011 films
Indian films about revenge
Indian action films
2011 masala films
Films scored by Thaman S
Films shot in Switzerland
Films shot in Hyderabad, India
2011 action films
Films directed by Ramesh Varma